Penthaleus major, known generally as the winter grain mite or blue oat mite, is a species of earth mite in the family Penthaleidae.

References

Further reading

External links

 

Trombidiformes
Animals described in 1834
Taxa named by Alfredo Dugès